Naai Sekar is a 2022 Indian Tamil-language science fantasy comedy film written and directed by debutant Kishore Rajkumar and produced by Kalpathi S. Aghoram under the banner AGS Entertainment. The film stars Sathish and Pavithra Lakshmi (in her debut) with a supporting cast including George Maryan, Ganesh, Livingston, Ilavarasu and Sriman. The film revolves around the story of a man who has his soul swapped with a Labrador Retriever. The film soundtrack featured three songs with a song composed by Anirudh Ravichander.

Plot 
Sekar is an IT employee who does not like his job much. His neighbour Rajarajan is a scientist who is hellbent on proving that it is possible to alter the DNA of humans and animals, thereby making humans have characteristics of animals. While the result of his experiment goes unexpected, one day a dog named Padayappa bites Sekar and that ends up in their characteristics getting swapped. The rest of the movie is about what happens next and how the two get back to their original selves.

Cast

Production 

The production company AGS Entertainment announced a new project with Sathish (in his debut lead role) and announced the title as Naai Sekar in September 2021. Pavithra Lakshmi who was contested earlier in Cooku with Comali TV show, was cast in the film as the female lead. The voice over for the dog was given by Shiva.

Title controversy 
Actor Vadivelu also planned his next film title as Naai Sekar with director Suraj which was bankrolled by Lyca Productions and the film was a spin-off of his character 'Naai Sekar' in the Thalai Nagaram (2006). But the title was already registered by AGS Entertainment. After a lot of discussions, the AGS Entertainment still kept the film as Naai Sekar. So the makers of Vadivelu's film had to go for an alteration in the title and finalised Naai Sekar Returns as their new title.

Music 
The soundtrack featured three songs with 'Edakku Modakku' song composed and sung by Anirudh Ravichander. The lyric was written by Sivakarthikeyan and choreography was done by Sandy for 'Edakku Modakku' song. The other two songs were composed by Ajesh and the original background score was composed by Ms Jones Rupert.

Release 
The teaser of the film was released on 1 January 2022. The makers are planning to release the film on 13 January 2022 on the occasion of Pongal holidays.

Reception 
The film received mixed reviews from critics and audience.
Times of India rated 3 out of 5 stating Kishore Rajkumar's Naai Sekar has a great premise for a fun film, especially a kids-centric one. The brilliance of this idea is its simplicity – what if a man bitten by a dog starts behaving like one, while the begins to show human qualities? .Pinkvilla rated 2.5 out of 5 stating Naai sekar is not an out and out entertainer. It is more of a time pass comedy, while there was a chance that it could have been a lot better. Also, the fact is that audiences are fed up watching Manobala and Swaminathan playing the same managers again and again. What a dog can do, it has been shown very well. But it has to be done in the best possible way.
Behindwoods rated 2.5 out of 5 Overall, the film tags itself a fantasy comedy and we wish it had done more justice to the comedy part, especially with someone like Sathish in front of the camera. While a lot of jokes don't land the way intended, this film might end up as the kids' favourite out of all releases for Pongal, mainly because of the fantasy element. Barring the unique role switch between the dog and the human, and a few funny scenes, Naai Sekar could have been a lot better.

References

External links

2020s Tamil-language films
2022 directorial debut films
Indian science fiction comedy films
2022 science fiction films
2022 comedy films
2020s science fiction comedy films